Geumgwan Gaya (43–532), also known as Bon-Gaya (본가야, 本伽倻, "original Gaya") or Garakguk (가락국, "Garak State"), was the ruling city-state of the Gaya confederacy during the Three Kingdoms Period in Korea. It is believed to have been located around the modern-day city of Gimhae, Southern Gyeongsang province, near the mouth of the Nakdong River. Due to its geographic location, this kingdom played a dominant role in the regional affairs from the Byeonhan period onward to the end of the Gaya confederacy.

Rise of the kingdom 

Gaya confederacy (42–532 CE), founded by the King Suro, originated from the Byeonhan (also called Pyonhan, Byeon and Byeonjin) tribe, and it had 12 statelets. Byeonhan was one of the 3 Samhan, other 2 being Jinhan and Mahan. According to the Samguk Yusa, Geumgwan Kaya was made of 9 villages united by King Suro of Gaya. His wife and queen Heo Hwang-ok, whom he married in 48 AD, is believed to be from an Ayuta kingdom. As a confederacy of city states, Gaya rose to prosperity due to sea port trade with Japan and other states as well with land trade with China in the north. Daegaya was an important city state and sea port as part of the Gaya Confederacy, it is associated with the place the Queen Heo had first arrived in Korea from her foreign location.

During this early time in the history of Gaya, several waves of migration from the north, including the earlier-extant Gojoseon, Buyeo, and the Goguryeo, arrived and integrated with existing populations and stimulated cultural and political developments. A sharp break in burial styles is found in archaeological sites dated near the late 3rd century AD, when these migrations are to have taken place.  Burial forms associated with North Asian nomadic peoples, such as the burial of horses with the dead, suddenly replace earlier forms in the tombs of the elite. In addition, evidence exists indicating that earlier burials were systematically destroyed. In the early 1990s, a royal tomb complex was unearthed in Daeseong-dong, Gimhae, attributed to Geumgwan Gaya but apparently used since Byeonhan times.

According to the Records of the Three Kingdoms, It is presumed the four countries, Sinunsin (Anra (安邪踧支濆), Sinbunhwal (臣離兒不例) and Geumgwan (拘邪秦支廉), had a superior position in the southern peninsula around the 3rd century.

Religion

Centuries after Buddhism originated in India, Mahayana Buddhism arrived in China through Silk Road transmission of Buddhism in 1st century CE via Tibet, then into the Korean peninsula in the 3rd century CE during the Three Kingdoms Period from where Buddhism was transmitted to Japan. In Korea, Buddhism was adopted as the state religion by three constituent polities of the Three Kingdoms Period: first by the Goguryeo ruling tribe of Geumgwan Gaya in 372 CE, then by Silla in 528 CE, and lastly by Baekje in 552 CE.

List of kings

In chronological order:

 Geumgwan Gaya (lit. Gaya Confederacy) or Bon Gaya (lit. Original Gaya) era
 King Suro
 King Geodeung
 King Mapum
 King Geojilmi
 King Isipum
 King Jwaji
 King Chwihui
 King Jilji
 King Gyeomji
 King Guhyeoung

Decline 

Geumgwan Gaya declined due to the wars with Japan and the tribes in north. Its various constituent city statelets fell one by one to Silla. After Geumgwan Gaya capitulated to Silla in 532 AD, its royal house was accepted into the Sillan aristocracy (perhaps because by that time, a major house of Silla, of the Gyeongju Kim clan, was related to the Gaya royal house, which was the Gimhae Kim clan) and given the rank of "true bone," the second-highest level of the Silla bone rank system. General Kim Yu-shin of Silla (also of the Gimhae Kim clan) was a descendant of the last king of Gaya.

Gallery

See also
 History of Korea
 List of Korean monarchs
 Daegaya
 Creation myth of Geumgwan Gaya

References

Cheol, S.K.  (2000).  Relations between Kaya and Wa in the third to fourth centuries AD.  Journal of East Asian Archeology 2(3-4), 112-122.
Il, yeon. Garak-gukgi chronicles, Samgukyusa

Gaya confederacy
Gayageu
Former countries in Korean history
43 establishments
532 disestablishments
Wajinden
States of the Wajinden